Carlos Ferreira da Silva Nunes (born 20 December 1914, date of death unknown) was a Portuguese footballer who played for FC Porto and the Portugal national team, as midfielder. Nunes made his international debut in a 3-3 draw against Spain 5 May 1935 in Lisbon and gained 3 caps and scored 1 goal for the national team.

External links 
 
 
 

1914 births
Year of death missing
FC Porto players
Portugal international footballers
Portuguese footballers
Primeira Liga players
Association football midfielders